Phenacaspidina is a subtribe of armored scale insects.

Genera
Nelaspis

References

Diaspidini